Susayqışlaq or Susaykyshlak or Susaykyshlakh may refer to:
 Susayqışlaq, Khachmaz, Azerbaijan
 Susayqışlaq, Quba, Azerbaijan